Rebecca Salsbury James (1891–1968) was a self-taught American painter, born in London, England of American parents who were traveling with the Buffalo Bill Wild West Show.  She settled in New York City, where she married photographer Paul Strand.  Following her divorce from Strand, James moved to Taos, New Mexico where she fell in with a group that included Mabel Dodge Luhan, Dorothy Brett, and Frieda Lawrence.  In 1937 she married William James, a businessman from Denver, Colorado who was then operating the Kit Carson Trading Company in Taos. She remained in Taos until her death in 1968.

James is noted for her “large scale flower blossoms and still lifes painted on glass."  She also worked on colcha embroidery, a traditional Hispanic New Mexico craft style.

Early life
Salsbury James was born to Nathan and Rachel Salsbury. She had two older brothers, Nathan and Milton, and a twin sister, Rachel. She grew up on New York City’s Upper West Side. With her twin sister, Rachel, she attended the Ethical Culture School beginning in 1905. She was a member of the glee club and basketball team. In 1915, she was valedictorian of the Teacher’s College graduating class. In 1917, she and her brother Nate published A Book of Children’s Songs.

In New York City and Taos
Rebecca Salsbury married photographer Paul Strand on January 21, 1922 in Manhattan. The two were active participants in the group of artists that showed their work at Alfred Stieglitz's galleries: 291, the Intimate Gallery, and An American Place. In addition to Stieglitz and Georgia O'Keeffe, the Strands were close to Marsden Hartley, Arthur Dove and Helen Torr, and Gaston and Isabel Lachaise.

In 1926, the Strands traveled to the west, visiting Mesa Verde National Park and cities including Denver, Santa Fe, and Taos. They had considered a European trip instead, but as Rebecca wrote to Paul, “Europe will still be there when we are middle-aged—we can still enjoy it—the West we should really see while we are young and sturdy—and that won’t last always.”   Strand enjoyed the southwest, and Mabel Dodge Luhan's hospitality, so much that she wrote to Stieglitz and O’Keeffe, “She’s been so lovely … why she has been so kind to us we do not know. Except that she probably is to everybody. She does want you both to come sometime—Georgia should … she would do some great things—Georgia, do come some day.” 

In 1929, Strand returned to New Mexico with O’Keeffe. The two stayed at Mabel Dodge Luhan’s compound in Taos, where Strand taught O’Keeffe to drive. The two painted throughout the summer. Strand and her husband returned to the southwest in 1930, 1931, and 1932. In 1933, the two divorced in Mexico and Rebecca returned to Taos, where she would marry businessman William James in 1937. In 1953 she published the book Allow Me to Present 18 Ladies and Gentlemen and Taos, N.M., 1885-1939.

Art and exhibitions

James created artwork in pastel and charcoal, but for the majority of her career she worked primarily in the technique of reverse painting on glass. She also participated in the revival of the Spanish colonial colcha stitch. She wrote, “This versatile stitch, for me, has provided a creative means to make a statement with stitches. The living world about one—the skies, the land, people, grasses, trees—can be imbued with immediate life.”

James participated in her first group exhibition at the Opportunity Gallery in New York City in 1928. She exhibited her paintings at the following institutions:
 An American Place (1932, 1936)
 Denver Art Museum, Chappell House (1933)
 New Mexico Museum of Art (1934)
 Colorado Springs Fine Arts Center (1939)
 Palace of the Legion of Honor (1951)
 Santa Barbara Art Museum (1951)
 Martha Jackson Gallery (1954)

She showed her embroidery at:
 Palace of the Governors, Santa Fe (1952);
 Harwood Foundation, University of New Mexico (1952);
 Museum of International Folk Art (1963); and
 Currier Gallery, New Hampshire (1964).
 
She also often participated in the annual exhibitions at the New Mexico Museum of Art in Santa Fe and the Harwood Foundation (now the Harwood Museum of Art) in Taos from the 1930s through the 1960s.

Collections
James' works can be found in the following collections:

 The Corning Museum of Glass, Corning, New York
Harwood Museum of Art, Taos, New Mexico
 New Mexico Museum of Art, Santa Fe, New Mexico
 University of New Mexico, University Art Museum, Albuquerque, New Mexico
 Taos Municipal Schools, Art Collection, Taos, New Mexico
 Taos Historic Museums, Blumenschein House, Taos, New Mexico
 Taos Health Systems, Holy Cross Hospital, Taos, New Mexico
 Philbrook Museum of Art, Tulsa, Oklahoma
 High Museum of Art, Atlanta, Georgia
 Harvard Art Museums, Cambridge, MA
 Baltimore Museum of Art, Baltimore, MD

References

External links
 Rebecca Salisbury James Papers. Yale Collection of American Literature, Beinecke Rare Book and Manuscript Library.

1891 births
1968 deaths
American women painters
Artists from Taos, New Mexico
Flower artists
Abstract painters
20th-century American women artists
20th-century American painters
Painters from New York City
Painters from New Mexico
Painters from London
American embroiderers
British emigrants to the United States